Surreal may refer to:

Anything related to or characteristic of Surrealism, a movement in philosophy and art
"Surreal" (song), a 2000 song by Ayumi Hamasaki
Surreal (album), an album by Man Raze
Surreal humour, a common aspect of humor
Surreal numbers, a superset of the real numbers in mathematics
Surreal Software, an American video game studio

See also
Surrealist automatism
Surrealist Manifesto
Surrealist techniques
Surrealist music